The Repoblación was the ninth-century repopulating of a large region between the River Duero and the Cantabrian Mountains, which had been depopulated in the early years of the Reconquista.

In the reign of Alfonso I of Asturias (739–757), through a series of successful military campaigns against the Moors, the Christians had retaken Galicia, La Rioja, and León and brought the population of the northern regions firmly under their control.  This left those provinces largely empty of human settlement and created a buffer zone between Moors and Christians. This region was called the Desert of the Duero. This zone was left untouched for almost a century while Alfonso's successors focused their energies on Vasconia and Galicia.

It was during the reign of Ordoño I of Asturias (850–866) that the repopulation of the uninhabited zone began.  Ordoño began advancing to the south, repopulating the cities of Tui, Astorga, León, and Amaya. The people who descended the mountains of the north for the uninhabited valleys were called foramontanos, meaning "out of the mountains." Among the routes the foramontanos took was that between Cabuérniga and Campo de Suso, which was followed as early as 824, when the new population of Brañosera received the oldest known fuero in Spanish history.

The desire for newer, more fertile agricultural zones in the river valleys of the Ebro and Duero was the chief driving factor in the emigrations.  From this time the kingdom increasingly became known as that of León and in 910, on the death of Ordoño's son, Alfonso III, the kingdom was divided with Fruela II continuing to reign in Asturias while his brothers García and Ordoño ruled in León and Galicia respectively.  The repoblación was then complete.

The region was never completely depopulated, as archaeological research has since shown a limited continuity of occupation Desert of the Duero.

The Portuguese Repovoação occurred during the reigns of the House of Burgundy up to the middle of the thirteenth century.

See also
Repoblación art and architecture

References
 Aramburu y Zuloaga, Félix de. "Repoblación de los montes asturianos." Revista de Asturias. 16 June 1879 
 "La Repoblación" 

Reconquista
9th century in Spain
Kingdom of Asturias